Book One: Water is the first season of Avatar: The Last Airbender, an American animated television series produced by Nickelodeon Animation Studio. Created by Michael Dante DiMartino and Bryan Konietzko, the first season premiered on Nickelodeon on February 21, 2005. It consisted of 20 episodes and concluded on December 2, 2005. The series starred Zach Tyler Eisen, Mae Whitman, Jack DeSena, Dante Basco, Dee Bradley Baker, Mako Iwamatsu, and Jason Isaacs as the main character voices.

The season revolves around the protagonist Aang and his friends Katara and Sokka going on a journey to the North Pole to find a Waterbending master to teach Aang and Katara. The Fire Nation is waging a seemingly endless imperialist war against the Earth Kingdom and the Water Tribes, following the genocide of the Air Nomads one hundred years ago. Aang, the current Avatar, must master the four elements (Air, Water, Earth, and Fire) to end the war. Along the way, Aang and his friends are chased by various pursuers: the banished Fire Nation Prince Zuko, along with his uncle and former general Iroh, and Admiral Zhao of the Fire Navy.

Each episode of the season attracted more than a million viewers on its first airing. Between January 31, 2006, and September 19, 2006, five DVD sets were released in the United States, each containing four episodes from the season. On September 12, 2006, Nickelodeon also released the "Complete Book 1 Collection Box Set", which contained all of the episodes in the season as well as a special features disc. The original releases were encoded in Region 1, a DVD type that plays only in North American DVD players. From 2007 to 2009, Nickelodeon released Region 2 DVDs, which can play in Europe.

Book One: Water was adapted into a live-action film, titled The Last Airbender, directed by M. Night Shyamalan and released in July 2010, becoming universally panned by critics, audiences and the series' fans for numerous reasons.


Episodes

Production
The show was produced by Nickelodeon Animation Studio and aired on Nickelodeon, both of which are owned by Viacom. The show's executive producers were co-creators Michael Dante DiMartino and Bryan Konietzko, who worked alongside head writer and co-producer Aaron Ehasz. Eight episodes were directed by Dave Filoni. Animation directors Lauren MacMullan and Giancarlo Volpe directed five episodes each, and Anthony Lioi directed two. 

Episodes were written or co-written by a team of writers, which included Nick Malis, John O'Bryan, Matthew Hubbard, James Eagan, Ian Wilcox, Tim Hedrick and Elizabeth Welch. 
All of the show's music was composed by "The Track Team", which consists of Jeremy Zuckerman and Benjamin Wynn, who were known to the producers because Zuckerman was Konietzko's roommate.  
Two alternating Korean studios were enlisted to provide animation production support for the series, DR Movie and JM Animation Co.

Cast
Most of the show's main characters made their debut within most, if not all, of the first episodes: Zach Tyler Eisen provided Aang's voice, Mae Whitman as Katara's voice, Jack DeSena as Sokka's voice, Dante Basco as Zuko's voice, Mako as Iroh's voice, and Dee Bradley Baker as the voices of both Appa and Momo. Additional supporting characters include Admiral Zhao, voiced by Jason Isaacs.

Reception
Film critics appreciated the first season of Avatar: The Last Airbender because it attracted the attention of "an audience beyond the children's market with crisp animation and layered storytelling." On the review aggregator Rotten Tomatoes, critical consensus for the first season reads, "A brilliant blend of magic, humor, and adventure, Avatar is an instant classic." As for the video and picture quality, Gord Lacey from TVShowsOnDVD.com claims "the colors are bright, and the picture is nearly flawless." He says later in the review that "the audio is very nice, with lots of directional effects and nice musical cues." Barnes & Noble reviewer Christina Urban praised the season's masterful combination of "elements from Chinese kung fu, Tibetan philosophy, Japanese martial arts forms, and even Hindu spiritual beliefs". According to Aaron Bynum from AnimationInsider.net, "the series posted double digit year-to-year gains in May". He also said that the show has been number one in the boys 9- to 14-year-old demographic, and has attracted many age and gender groups in its pool of 1.1 million viewers who watch each new episode.

In addition, the season has won many awards throughout its runtime. During the 33rd Annual Annie Awards, the show was nominated for the "Best Animated Television Production" award. Because of the episode "The Fortuneteller", the show was nominated for the "Writing for an Animated Television Production" award. For the episode "The Deserter", the season was nominated for and won the "Storyboarding in an Animated Television Production" award. During the 2005 Pulcinella Awards, the season won the "Best Action/Adventure TV Series" award as well and the general "Best TV Series" award.

DVD releases

Region 1
Nickelodeon started releasing Season One DVDs in North America on January 31, 2006, with a series of single-disc sets containing four episodes per disc. Later the Complete Book 1 Collection was released on September 12, 2006, containing all twenty episodes plus extras on six discs.

Region 2
PAL versions of the single-disc volume sets started being released on February 19, 2007;. As with the original Region 1 NTSC DVDs, each set contains four episodes per disc. The Complete Book One Collection was released on January 26, 2009, containing all twenty episodes on five discs. These Region 2 releases lack the commentary tracks and other DVD extras found on the Region 1 releases.

Film adaptation

The Last Airbender is a live-action film based on the first season of the animated television series and had a theatrical release on July 1, 2010. The film was directed by M. Night Shyamalan.

Footnotes
1. Production code format taken from the commentary for "Sozin's Comet: The Phoenix King"

References

Avatar: The Last Airbender
2005 American television seasons

es:Anexo:Episodios de Avatar: la leyenda de Aang#Libro Uno: Agua
fr:Liste des épisodes d'Avatar, le dernier maître de l'air#Livre Un : L'Eau